Walter Maciel Gallery is an art gallery founded in 2005, located at 2642 S. La Cienega Boulevard, in the Culver City Arts District in Los Angeles, California, United States. Walter Maciel worked as a gallery director in San Francisco for fourteen years before he moved to Southern California and opened his own space. Maciel has served on many boards and committees, including Southern Exposure, Headlands Center for the Arts, Hospitality House in San Francisco, and the San Francisco Art Dealers Association. He has been on lecture panels at UCLA, the San Francisco Art Institute, California College of the Arts, UC Berkeley, Pacific Northwest College of Art, University of Missouri, Kansas City, Ulrich Museum of Art, Wichita State University, Wichita, KS and the Institute of Contemporary Art, San Jose.

Walter Maciel Gallery shows emerging and established contemporary artists in mediums ranging from painting and sculpture to conceptual photography and video. The gallery represents the work of Chinese born Hung Liu; Los Angeles artists Lezley Saar, Maria E. Piñeres, Rachael Neubauer, Carolyn Castaño, Andy Kolar, Nike Schroeder, Dana Weiser, Greg Mocilnikar and Brendan Lott; Bay Area artists Cynthia Ona Innis, John Bankston, Katherine Sherwood, Robb Putnam and Lisa Solomon; New York artists Dean Monogenis, Pepa Prieto, John Jurayj, Jil Weinstock and Timothy Paul Myers, among other prominent artists such as Barry Anderson, Freddy Chandra and Colin Doherty. The gallery participates in international art fairs, including The Armory Show, Aqua Art Miami, Art on Paper NY, ArtPad San Francisco, artMRKT San Francisco, Edition Chicago, Miami Project, NADA Miami Beach, Next Chicago, Pulse London, Pulse Miami, Pulse Miami Beach, Pulse New York, Swab Barcelona, Untitled Miami Beach and Volta New York.

Artists represented include:

 Barry Anderson
 John Bankston
 Carolyn Castaño
 Freddy Chandra
 Colin Doherty
 Cynthia Ona Innis
 John Jurayj
 Andy Kolar
 Hung Liu
 Brendan Lott
 Greg Mocilnikar
 Dean Monogenis
 Timothy Paul Myers 
 Rachael Neubauer
 Maria E. Piñeres
 Pepa Prieto
 Robb Putnam
 Lezley Saar
 Nike Schröder
 Katherine Sherwood
 Lisa Solomon
 Jil Weinstock
 Dana Weiser

References

External links
 Walter Maciel Gallery website

2005 establishments in California
Contemporary art galleries in the United States
Art museums and galleries in Los Angeles
Art in Greater Los Angeles
Art galleries established in 2005
American people of Portuguese descent